Crash Bandicoot: On the Run! was a 2021 mobile endless runner game developed and published by King. The game showcased the series' characters and fictional universe in the context of a runner game. Players controlled Crash or his sister Coco, running through levels and defeating enemies using weaponry crafted from collectible ingredients. Players could use cosmetic skins to increase their amount of gathered resources and could engage in asynchronous multiplayer gameplay by competing for survival in procedurally generated levels. Several updates were installed throughout 2021, often in the form of new levels, bosses, and cosmetic skins.

King acquired a license to create a Crash Bandicoot mobile game from Activision in 2020. The game's director sought to place an increased emphasis on exploration compared to other runner titles, and the development team set out to incorporate as much of the franchise's history as possible by implementing several obscure and older characters. Crash Bandicoot: On the Run! was soft launched in Malaysia in April 2020 before its wide release in March 2021. It received mixed reviews from critics, who praised the presentation, but criticized the lack of challenge and repetitive gameplay. The game was a commercial success, topping download charts in several countries and becoming the fastest downloaded mobile game within four days. The game was discontinued in 2023.

Gameplay

Crash Bandicoot: On the Run! was a runner game in which players controlled either the titular character Crash or his sister Coco, who were tasked with saving the multiverse from domination by Doctor Neo Cortex and his minions. Levels consisted of three-lane paths, in which Crash and Coco ran in perpetuity. Players could control the character's actions by swiping the screen; swiping left or right caused them to switch lanes while swiping up and down made them jump and slide downward respectively. Players could tap on the screen to initiate a spin attack which could be used to destroy crates and enemies. Players could collect Wumpa Fruit that were scattered throughout the levels, and the number of steps Crash and Coco take was recorded and accumulated. Mechanics carried over from the main series included Aku Aku masks that protected Crash and Coco from enemies and hazards, as well as checkpoint crates that preserved players' progress.

The main gameplay mode was "battle runs", in which players navigated a series of levels that had mini-bosses at the end of each one. Mini-bosses were defeated by getting within proximity and using an assortment of weapons such as serums, bombs, and rayguns. To obtain these weapons, players partook in "collection runs", in which Crash or Coco ran through a level and collected ingredients. Collectible cosmetic skins granted bonuses that augmented the number of resources that players collected. Additional resources could be obtained by completing level-specific challenges provided by Aku Aku. The gathered ingredients allowed players to craft the weapons within a hub area referred to as "Coco's Base". The process of crafting could be accelerated with Purple Crystals, which acted as in-game currency and could be purchased with real-world currency. Certain resources gathered from collection runs could be used to upgrade the crafting structures and widen the range of weapons that could be created. After defeating a series of mini-bosses, the player could engage in a boss battle, in which explosive "Boom Berries" would be collected and thrown at the boss to reduce their health.

The player's steps and Wumpa Fruit could be given to a tiki statue within Coco's Base in exchange for trophies, which elevated the player's position on a leaderboard. Also in the base was a vending machine from which resources and skins could be bought; free resources could be acquired daily by watching a short advertisement. The game featured asynchronous multiplayer that allowed players to compete with each other in "survival runs", in which three players ran through a procedurally generated level and attempted to survive the longest. Participating in a survival run cost a ticket, which could be purchased from the vending machine. Like the main series, the game included "Time Trials" in which the player attempted to finish a level in the fastest time possible and break special crates that freeze the timer for a set number of seconds. The player was then rewarded with a sapphire, gold, or platinum relic depending on how quickly the level was completed, and the player's best time could be shared with the community.

Development 
In February 2020, King was reported to have acquired a license from Activision to develop a mobile game based on Crash Bandicoot; the title's existence was previously leaked through Brazilian Facebook advertisements and highlighted by a Twitter user. The game's engine was developed using Unity under the creative direction of Stephen Jarrett, with Nana Li as the lead conceptual artist and Gigi Chui as the principal designer. Jarrett sought to elevate the runner genre by placing an increased emphasis on exploration, which influenced the variety and detail of the levels. The development team adopted a goal to make "the Crashiest Crash game ever", and set about achieving this by extensively studying and drawing upon the franchise's 25-year history and incorporating characters within the series considered "classic" and "obscure". King stated the game would feature over a hundred cosmetic skins and no loot boxes. Instead, the game would feature battle pass, and seasonal content consisting of special challenges, storylines, and unique bosses. The soundtrack was composed by a team led by Sebastian Aav, and consists of over 50 tracks with an eclectic range of genres including disco, metal, and funk. Both real and virtual instruments were used in the creation of the game's score.

Release and updates 
Crash Bandicoot: On the Run! was soft launched on Android in Malaysia on April 22, 2020 under the tentative title Crash Bandicoot Mobile. Three months later, King officially announced a future wide release for iOS and Android under its current title with pre-registration on the Google Play and App stores. It was initially scheduled to release worldwide on March 25, 2021 for both iOS and Android, however, iOS version was released two days earlier.

Starting in May, the game received monthly updates featuring new levels, survival runs, skins, and bosses. Beginning on May 7, The Noid — a mascot character for Domino's Pizza during the 1980s — was featured as a miniboss for a limited time, and pizza-themed skins were rewarded to players who defeated the Noid. The game's latest update was released on September 23 and featured Halloween-themed skins and battle runs. On October 27, 2021, the game's development team announced a temporary hiatus from major updates in favor of building improvements and new features.

On December 19, 2022, King announced that the game's servers would be deactivated on February 16, 2023, rendering the game unplayable. On the day of the announcement, all in-app purchases were disabled, with King giving players until the game's deactivation to make use of in-game currency. Earlier in the month, the game was silently delisted from app stores, which the game's customer support team claimed was a temporary issue.

Reception

Critical analysis
Crash Bandicoot: On the Run! received "mixed or average" reviews according to Metacritic. Harry Slater of Gamezebo and Dave Trumbore of Collider regarded the title as a solid auto-runner and complimented the game's accessibility and presentation. Although Slater considered the game to be standard for its genre, Trumbore commended the extra challenge provided by the mini-missions and multiplayer mode. Pocket Tactics reviewer, Glen Fox, acknowledged the game's authentic presentation and responsive controls and enjoyed the multiplayer mode, but was disappointed by the low difficulty and lack of gameplay variety. Gamereactors Kieran Harris appreciated the faithfulness of the visuals and music, and was impressed by the graphics, claiming them to be some of the best he had seen on a mobile game. However, while he found the core gameplay to be addictive, he criticized the implementation of the microtransactions, which he felt stagnated the game's pacing for those unwilling to pay for the in-game currency, and he deemed the enemy and boss encounters to be repetitive. Nandini Yadav of Firstpost was thrilled by the prospect of a Crash Bandicoot runner game and found the general experience to be entertaining, but cited the high data consumption and lack of challenge as flaws.

Commercial performance
On the day of its iOS release, Crash Bandicoot: On the Run! became the most downloaded iOS game in 91 countries as well as the most downloaded iOS app in 76 countries according to Sensor Tower. Following its full launch on March 25, the game was downloaded more than 8.1 million times in one day. It topped the Google Play game chart in 31 countries, as well as the chart for overall downloaded apps in six countries. The game had also previously been downloaded millions of times from being launched in limited regions for pre-release testing several weeks prior to the game's official release. The majority of its downloads occurred in the United States, with the other top four spots occupied by Mexico, Brazil, and the United Kingdom. App analytics platform App Annie registered a slightly higher figure of 9.1 million downloads across the top eight markets, which included Brazil, Mexico, Italy, Russia, France, Germany, and Spain; according to App Annie, the United States contributed 2.6 million downloads, which made up 28.5% of its total figure. NPD Group analyst Mat Piscatella cited the game's success as a factor in sustained console sales for Crash Bandicoot 4: It's About Time.

Within four days of its full release, Crash Bandicoot: On the Run! became the fastest game to reach 20 million downloads between the App and Google Play stores, surpassing the previous record holder Temple Run 2 by a factor of five. App Annie senior market insights manager Donny Kristianto attributed the game's success to its familiarity and freshness, elaborating that "It features the same characters and gameplay mechanic familiar to console fans, yet the game also takes cues from other popular runner games like Subway Surfers and Temple Run — with simple gesture controls making it accessible for both fans of the console titles and new mobile gamers". According to Sensor Tower's Q1 Data Digest report, the game generated $700,000 in revenue within its first week, the second best first week for a King title behind Candy Crush Jelly Saga in 2016.

By the end of March, the game had accumulated 27 million downloads and was the month's second most downloaded mobile game worldwide, behind Supersonic Studios' Join Clash 3D. It topped the month's App Store chart and placed third in the month's Google Play chart behind Join Clash 3D and Garena Free Fire. According to App Annie, it was the second most downloaded new mobile game in the United States in Q1 2021 behind Zynga's High Heels!. It was also the quarter's third most downloaded new game in the United Kingdom, and the quarter's most downloaded new game in Germany.

Notes

References

External links 
 

2021 video games
Crash Bandicoot games
Mobile games
Android (operating system) games
Delisted digital-only games
Endless runner games
Inactive online games
IOS games
Multiplayer and single-player video games
Platform games
Products and services discontinued in 2023
Video game sequels
Video games developed in Malta
Video games about parallel universes
Video games set in Australia
King (company) games